Rohit Bakshi is an Indian television actor. He played the role of Piyush Raheja in Balaji Telefilms' soap opera Kahiin To Hoga and a double role in the supernatural TV series Maharakshak: Devi which was telecast on Zee TV.

In 2013 he made his Bollywood debut with thriller film Dehraadun Diary. He played the role of Lord Shiva in Siya Ke Ram and currently appears as Ankush Kapadia in Anupamaa.

Personal life
Bakshi hails from Delhi. He dated actress Aashka Goradia from 2006 to 2016.

Filmography

Films

Television

References

External links
 

21st-century Indian male actors
Indian male television actors
Indian male models
Living people
Male actors from Delhi
Year of birth missing (living people)
Actors from Mumbai